Jüri Põld may refer to:
 Jüri Põld (politician) (born 1952), Estonian politician
 Jüri Põld (judge) (born 1956), Estonian judge